The C7 Nella Bayonet is a standard issued multi-purpose infantry bayonet by the Canadian Armed Forces of Canada, issued to match the serving standard issued C7/C8 variant rifles, supplied and manufactured by Nella Canada. It was replaced by CAN Bayonet 2000/2005 after 2004.

Description 

C7 Nella Bayonet can be fitted to standard issued C7/C8 rifle and its variants, most notably, the standard issued infantry C7A2 rifle, C8 and SFW variants of C7 type rifles.

The C7 Bayonet was designed to replace the outdated C1 bayonet and X2E1 bayonet, after the change of standard issued rifle from C1A1 rifle to C7 rifles by the Canadian Armed Forces.

There is no major significant difference between the C1 bayonet and C7 bayonet, but the change of standard issued rifles is critical to the development for the C7 bayonet. This is demonstrated by the British Army and their change of standard service rifle and military tactics as well as their designation for the roles of regular infantry combatants, and the cartridge number-to-weight problem on rifle cartridges of 5.56x45mm versus 7.62x51mm was part of the factor as well.

Hence, the change of C1A1 service rifle meant the standard issued C1 bayonet is also in need of change, since the change of C1A1 to C7 rifle would also mean the change of related essential utilities, such as the bayonet.

By 2004, the C7 Bayonet was replaced by CAN Bayonet 2000, ending its service record.

C7 Bayonet and Bayonet Part NATO Stock number:

C7 Bayonet Scabbard: NSN 1095-21-897-1467

C7 Nylon Belt Frog (Belt Scabbard Carrier): NSN 8465-21-896-8168

C7 Tactical Vest/TV Frog (Vest Scabbard Carrier): NSN 8465-21-920-5771

See also 

 M9 Bayonet
 C1A1 Rifle
 Colt M16A3 Rifle
 List of equipment of the Canadian Army

References 

Weapons of Canada
Military knives
Bayonets